is a Japanese manga artist who writes mostly shōnen manga. Tsunomaru is best known for the horse-racing comedy Midori no Makibaō, which was adapted as a 61-episode anime television series and received the 1997 Shogakukan Manga Award for children's manga.

Style 
Tsunomaru is known for his distinct drawing style. Most of his characters have monkey-like features, most notable in his manga Mon Mon Mon!, including short stature, small eyes, large nostrils, big lips, and if male, exposed genitals.

Works
Mon mon mon (モンモンモン), Weekly Shōnen Jump (1992 - 1993, 8 volumes)
Midori no Makibaō (みどりのマキバオー), Weekly Shōnen Jump (1994 - 1998, 16 volumes)
Survibee (サバイビー sabaibi-),  Weekly Shōnen Jump (1999, 3 volumes)
Jūshin Igari Tora Jirō (重臣猪狩虎次郎), Weekly Shōnen Jump (2001, 2 volumes)
Gocchan desu!! (ごっちゃんです!!), Weekly Shōnen Jump (2003 - 2004, 5 volumes)
Taiyō no Makibaō (たいようのマキバオー), Weekly Playboy (2007 - 2011, 16 volumes)
Taiyō no Makibaō W (たいようのマキバオーW), Weekly Playboy (2011 - 2016, 20 volumes)

References

External links
 Profile at The Ultimate Manga Guide
 Fansite 
 Midori no Makibaō Official Website 

1970 births
Manga artists
Artists from Chiba Prefecture
Living people